Edward Hector Burn (20 November 1922 – 6 February 2019) was an English barrister and legal scholar and fellow of Christ Church, a constituent college of the University of Oxford. He updated Geoffrey Cheshire's Modern Law of Real Property which became known as "Cheshire and Burn".

References 

1922 births
2019 deaths
People from Oxford
Fellows of Christ Church, Oxford
British legal scholars
English barristers
People educated at St Edward's School, Oxford
Alumni of Wadham College, Oxford
20th-century English lawyers